The Child & Family Services Open was a golf tournament on the LPGA Tour, played only in 1973. It was played at the Midlane Country Club in Wadsworth, Illinois. Betty Burfeindt won the event by three strokes over Debbie Austin and Laura Baugh.

References

External links
Results at golfobserver.com

Former LPGA Tour events
Golf in Illinois
1973 establishments in Illinois
1973 disestablishments in Illinois
History of women in Illinois